Potosi is a census-designated place (CDP) in Taylor County, Texas, United States. Its population was 2,991 at the 2010 census. It is part of the Abilene, Texas metropolitan statistical area.

Geography
Potosi is located at  (32.335615, -99.665777). It is situated along FM 1750, about 9 miles south of Abilene in east-central Taylor County.

According to the United States Census Bureau, the CDP has a total area of 18.5 sq mi (47.8 km2), all of it land.

Climate
According to the Köppen climate classification, Potosi has a humid subtropical climate, Cfa on climate maps, typically characterized by hot, humid summers and generally mild to cool winters.  Potosi also borders the neighboring semiarid climate (Köppen BSh or BSk) of the west-central Texas region,  which has characteristically long, hot summers and short, moderate winters.

History
The first settlers in the area were the Pollard family in the 1870s. In 1893, R.A. Pollard applied for a post office and chose the name Potosi after the Mexican city of San Luis Potosí. An estimated 100 inhabitants were living in the community in 1896. By 1940, 80 residents, a school, a church, four businesses, and a number of dwellings were there. In 1949, Potosi's school consolidated with the Wylie Independent School District.

The population declined to 20 during the 1950s, and rose to 149 in 1968. Significant growth in the area, aided by its proximity to Abilene, began to occur in the late 1980s, and by 1992, 1,441 people were living in Potosi. That growth has continued to date, as new subdivisions are being constructed and expanded along FM 1750, the main route through Potosi. They include Deerwood, Pack Saddle Prairie, Blackhawk Estates, Pack Saddle Farms, Seven Winds, and Pack Saddle Meadows.

Demographics

2020 census

As of the 2020 United States census, there were 3,947 people, 1,266 households, and 1,032 families residing in the CDP.

2000 census
As of the census of 2000,  1,664 people, 589 households, and 501 families resided in the CDP. The population density was 90.1 people/sq mi (34.8/km2). The 624 housing units averaged 33.8/sq mi (13.1/km2). The racial makeup of the CDP was 95.25% White, 0.66% African American, 0.30% Native American, 0.66% Asian, 0.06% Pacific Islander, 2.04% from other races, and 1.02% from two or more races. Hispanics or Latinos of any race were 5.23% of the population.

Of the 589 households, 42.6% had children under the age of 18 living with them, 75.0% were married couples living together, 6.6% had a female householder with no husband present, and 14.9% were not families; 12.7% of all households were made up of individuals, and 5.4% had someone living alone who was 65 years of age or older. The average household size was 2.83 and the average family size was 3.08.

In the CDP, the age distribution was 27.6% under 18, 6.8% from 18 to 24, 29.1% from 25 to 44, 26.7% from 45 to 64, and 9.7% who were 65  or older. The median age was 38 years. For every 100 females, there were 95.5 males. For every 100 females age 18 and over, there were 92.9 males.

The median income for a household in the CDP was $49,438, and for a family was $56,471. Males had a median income of $38,839 versus $20,822 for females. The per capita income for the CDP was $19,997. About 9.5% of families and 7.9% of the population were below the poverty line, including 6.8% of those under age 18 and 22.6% of those age 65 or over.

Services
The residents of Potosi, Texas receive water from the Potosi Water Supply Corporation, and they are protected by the Potosi Volunteer Fire Department.

References

External links
 Potosi Volunteer Fire Department

Census-designated places in Taylor County, Texas
Census-designated places in Texas
Abilene metropolitan area